Frauenfeld Marktplatz railway station is a railway station in the municipality of Frauenfeld, in the Swiss canton of Thurgau. It is located on the  Frauenfeld–Wil line of Appenzell Railways.

Services 
 the following services stop at Frauenfeld Marktplatz:

References

External links 
 
 

Railway stations in the canton of Thurgau
Appenzell Railways stations